Dream, After Dream, performed by the American rock band Journey, is the soundtrack album to the Japanese fantasy film Yume, Yume No Ato directed by fashion designer Kenzo Takada. Released in 1980 on Columbia Records, it was the seventh album-length recording by the group. The soundtrack firmly overshadowed the film itself, which enjoyed little fame. The album was a significant departure from the hard rock which characterized the band's three preceding albums, harking back to their progressive rock beginnings and relying on complex musicianship and instrumentals.

Dream, After Dream features a full vocal on three of its nine tracks, "Destiny", "Sand Castles" and "Little Girl". "Little Girl" was later the B-side of the "Open Arms" single and was featured on Journey's Time3 collection. It also appears as a bonus track on the 2006 reissue of Departure and the 2011 edition of Greatest Hits 2. "Destiny" is the band's longest recorded song.

This was the last studio album to feature founding member Gregg Rolie.

Reception

Dream, After Dream has been viewed as a major departure from the commercially successful, radio-friendly pop of their previous three albums, instead harking back to their early, progressive rock-oriented work. AllMusic wrote, "One of the most overlooked albums in Journey's catalogue ... Dream, After Dream is a fine example of Journey's underrated musicianship, and recommended for devoted fans." Dave Marsh, normally an ardent detractor of the band, was even more enthusiastic, describing the album as "the band's finest recording of the 80's".

Track listing

Personnel
Band members
Steve Perry – lead vocals, producer
Neal Schon – guitars, vocals, producer
Gregg Rolie – keyboards, piano, harmonica, vocals, producer
Ross Valory – bass guitar, vocals, producer
Steve Smith – drums, percussion, producer

Additional musicians
Eiji Arai, Yasuo Hirauchi, Tadataka Nakazawa, Sumio Okada - trombones
Toshio Araki, Yoshikazu Kishi, Kenji Yoshida, Takatoki Yoshioka - trumpets
Takashi Fukumori, Hachiro Ohmatsu, Kiyoshi Ohsawa, Masatsugu Shinozaki - violins
Hiroto Kawamura, Kazuo Okamoto - cellos
Masayuki Yamashiro - horn
Strings and horns arranged and conducted by Matthew A. Schon

Production
Kevin Elson - producer, engineer, mixing
Akira Fukada, Geoff Workman - engineers

References 

Film soundtracks
Journey (band) albums
Albums produced by Kevin Elson
1980 soundtrack albums
Columbia Records soundtracks